The Lexington Conservatory Theatre was a summer stock company in the Catskills town of Lexington, New York.  Co-founded in 1976 by Oakley Hall III,  Michael Van Landingham, and Bruce Bouchard, the theatre operated for five seasons at the historic Lexington House, a former hotel turned artist retreat. Hall was seriously injured in a fall from a bridge during the summer of 1978. That summer and Hall's life in the aftermath of a traumatic brain injury were the subjects of the documentary The Loss of Nameless Things.

Formation
Oakley Hall III, Michael van Landingham, Thomas Culp and Bruce Bouchard had attended college at UC Irvine together, and continued to work together at South Coast Repertory Theatre. The group of friends  eventually moved to New York City to continue their careers. In 1969, Evelyn Weisberg, owner of Lexington House, met Bouchard and fellow actor Kate Kelly while operating a local educational theatre program. Learning of the nascent theatre group forming in New York, Weisberg supported the formation of the group in 1975, inviting them to take residence at Lexington House and its surrounding facilities. LCT launched its first season in 1976.

Move to Albany
In spring 1979, LCT announced that it would form a theatre in downtown Albany, NY, that followed a fall-winter-spring season, to be known as Capital Repertory Company or "Capital Rep." That winter, LCT produced The Tavern by George M. Cohan at the Egg Theatre in Albany, under the Capital Rep name.In October of 1980, executive director Michael Van Landingham announced that the theatre would not return to Lexington House and instead move permanently to Albany. In December 1980, the group began its first full season as Capital Repertory Theatre at Page Hall in Albany.

Notable alumni
Patricia Charbonneau
Steve Hytner
Cotter Smith
Richard Zobel
Sofia Landon Geier

Productions
Frankenstein by Oakley Hall III
The Prevalence of Mrs. Seal by Otis Bigelow

References

Theatre companies in New York (state)